John Clinton Knox (born July 26, 1948) is an American former professional baseball player.

He was a second baseman in Major League Baseball who played in four seasons with the Detroit Tigers from 1972 to 1975.

Knox attended Bowling Green State University and was drafted by the Tigers in the eighth round of the 1970 Major League Baseball Draft. He played in 124 games for the Tigers, 69 at second base.  Knox had a career batting average of .274 with a .335 on-base percentage, 60 hits, 21 runs, 11 RBIs, and seven stolen bases.  His best season was 1974, when he hit .307 and played in a career-high 55 games.

References

External links

1948 births
Living people
Baseball players from Newark, New Jersey
Batavia Trojans players
Bowling Green Falcons baseball players
Detroit Tigers players
Evansville Triplets players
Indianapolis Indians players
Major League Baseball second basemen
Montgomery Rebels players
Toledo Mud Hens players